Acacia gittinsiiis a shrub belonging to the genus Acacia and the subgenus Phyllodineae that is native to parts of eastern Australia.

It is found in a small area of the Central Highlands region of Queensland on the Blackdown tableland to the south of Blackwater as a part of Eucalyptus woodland communities growing in sandy sandstone based soils.

See also
 List of Acacia species

References

gittinsii
Flora of Queensland
Plants described in 1964
Taxa named by Leslie Pedley